Ra'anan Cohen (born 28 February 1941) is a former Israeli politician who served as a government minister during the early 2000s.

Biography
Born in Baghdad in Iraq, Cohen made aliyah in 1951. During his youth he was a counsellor in the HaNoar HaOved VeHaLomed youth movement, and was secretary of the Labor Party youth guard in Bnei Brak until 1970. He took Middle Eastern studies at Tel Aviv University, gaining a BA, MA and PhD in the subject. He served as chairman of Labor Party's Arab and Druze branch between 1975 and 1986. Between 1986 and 1992, he chaired the party's elections branch.

In 1988, he was elected to the Knesset on the Alignment's list. He was re-elected in 1992 (by which time the Alignment had merged into the Labor Party), and 1996. In December 1997, he was elected secretary-general of the party, winning 76% of the vote. He retained his seat in the 1999 elections (on the One Israel list), and in August 2000, was appointed Minister of Labor and Social Welfare in Ehud Barak's government following Shas' departure from the coalition government.

When Ariel Sharon formed a national unity government following the special election for Prime Minister in 2001, Cohen became a Minister without Portfolio. He left the cabinet on 18 August 2002, and resigned from the Knesset three days later, retiring from politics.

Cohen has written several books, including Strangers in their Homeland: A Critical Study of Israel's Arab Citizens.

References

External links

1941 births
Living people
Iraqi Jews
People from Baghdad
Iraqi emigrants to Israel
Members of the 12th Knesset (1988–1992)
Members of the 13th Knesset (1992–1996)
Members of the 14th Knesset (1996–1999)
Members of the 15th Knesset (1999–2003)
Tel Aviv University alumni
Israeli Labor Party politicians
Alignment (Israel) politicians
One Israel politicians